Alirhabditis is a genus of nematodes belonging to the monotypic family Alirhabditidae.

The species of this genus are found in Central America.

Species:

Alirhabditis clavata 
Alirhabditis indica

References

Rhabditida
Nematode genera